Ken Johnston (born 1950 in Vancouver) is a politician in British Columbia, Canada. He is a former member of the Richmond city council, having previously sat on council from 1993 to 2001, and representing the Vancouver-Fraserview riding in the Legislative Assembly of British Columbia from 2001 to 2005.

Johnston graduated from Killarney Secondary School in 1968. He attended the University of British Columbia, and, upon earning his Certified General Accountant designation in 1976, worked as a public practice accountant before moving into private business in 1980.

From 1986, he was a director of Richmond Savings Credit Union, and from 1995 to 1998, he served as board chair. He is a past director of Coast Capital Savings. Before becoming a Member of the Legislative Assembly (MLA), Ken was serving the City of Richmond in his third term as a City councillor.

As an MLA, Johnston served as a member of the Government Caucus Committee on Government Operations. He also served on Legislative Standing Committees: Parliamentary Reform, Ethical Conduct, Standing Orders and Private Bills, Legislative Initiatives, and he was a member of the Special Committee to Review the Freedom of Information & Protection of Privacy Act. He previously served on the Health and Crown Corporations committees.

Ken and Diane Johnston married in 1972 in Fraserview and have two grown children, Scott and Jennifer.

References

1950 births
Living people
British Columbia Liberal Party MLAs
Businesspeople from Vancouver
University of British Columbia alumni
Politicians from Vancouver
Richmond, British Columbia city councillors
Canadian accountants
Canadian bankers
21st-century Canadian politicians